Tim Gurung is a Nepalese writer. Prior to taking on a career in writing, he served with the British Armed Forces as a Nepalese Gurkha.

He was born in Dhampus, Kaski District, Gandaki Province, Nepal.

Works

References 

21st-century Nepalese writers
People from Kaski District
Nepalese writers
Nepalese male writers
Gurkhas
Year of birth missing (living people)
Living people
Gurung people